Julia Ferrer (1925–1995), born in Lima, Peru, was a Peruvian poet and writer. She was fluent in English and French, and spoke some German, Portuguese and Quechua.

Ferrer took courses in theater at the National Institute of Dramatic Art (now ENSAD), and took courses at the School of Fine Arts of Lima.

Works published

References

1925 births
1995 deaths
People from Lima
Peruvian women poets
20th-century Peruvian poets
20th-century women writers